Gaming Show (In My Parents' Garage) is a Canadian television series that airs on Family Chrgd.

The show won a Canadian Screen Award nominee for Best Children's or Youth Non-Fiction Program at the 3rd Canadian Screen Awards in 2015.

The show was filmed in Toronto, Ontario, Canada.

Premise
The show is about three teenagers, Jesse, Julia, and Ian, who run a gaming show in Jesse's parents' garage. Each teen goes through a very different experience which involves learning about the world of video gaming (example: how sound is put into a game). They also interact with notable people from the video game industry and learn about their work. On occasion, they get to hang out with video game characters too (example: Mario). Depending on the episode, one of the teens try to prove to the other one's mistake in the consequence they are presently involved in. In the end, the other learns about his/her day and they all agree to have fun.

Hosts
Jesse Sukunda
Julia Schwartz
Ian Duchene

Guest Stars
Justin A Watkins (Thinknoodles)
Daniel Middleton (TheDiamondMinecart)
'Weird Al' Yankovic
Cast of Pixels
Tyrell Coleman (NAKAT)
Richard King Jr (Keitaro)
Ian D'sa and Aaron Solowoniuk of Billy Talent
Colin Mochrie
Andrew W.K

References

External links

Canadian children's comedy television series
2014 Canadian television series debuts
2010s Canadian children's television series
2010s Canadian comedy television series
Television series about teenagers
Television series by DHX Media